Tom Abatemarco (born October 3, 1949) is an American college basketball coach, currently an assistant for the Iona Gaels of the Metro Atlantic Athletic Conference (MAAC). Abatemarco has previously been a head coach at Lamar, Drake and Sacramento State. He was also an assistant to Jim Valvano on the 1983 national champion NC State team and spent time as a professional assistant in the Women's National Basketball Association and the NBA Development League.

Abatemarco's best season as a head coach came with Lamar in the 1987–88 season where the team won 20 games. He then moved to Drake, but his tenure there was short. After a player revolt in his second season he resigned his post on February 20, 1990.

In 2020, Abatemarco was hired by Rick Pitino as an assistant at Iona, marking his 21st coaching stop.

References

External links
Coaching record @ sports-reference.com
Iona Gaels bio

1949 births
Living people
American men's basketball coaches
American men's basketball players
Basketball coaches from New York (state)
Basketball players from New York (state)
Brentwood High School (Brentwood, New York) alumni
College men's basketball head coaches in the United States
Colorado Buffaloes men's basketball coaches
Davidson Wildcats men's basketball coaches
Dowling Golden Lions men's basketball players
Drake Bulldogs men's basketball coaches
Florida Gulf Coast Eagles men's basketball coaches
Iona Gaels men's basketball coaches
Lamar Cardinals basketball coaches
Loyola Marymount Lions men's basketball coaches
Maryland Terrapins men's basketball coaches
NC State Wolfpack men's basketball coaches
NYIT Bears men's basketball coaches
Reno Bighorns coaches
Rutgers Scarlet Knights men's basketball coaches
Sacramento Kings scouts
Sacramento Monarchs coaches
Sacramento State Hornets men's basketball coaches
Tulsa Golden Hurricane men's basketball coaches
Utah Utes men's basketball coaches
Virginia Tech Hokies men's basketball coaches